Gamasellus grossi is a species of mite in the family Ologamasidae.

References

grossi
Articles created by Qbugbot
Animals described in 1973